Kenny is a common given name and surname.

It may also refer to:

Places
In the United States:
 Kenny, California, an unincorporated community
 Kenny, Minneapolis, a neighborhood
 Kenney, Illinois, a village

In Australia:
 Kenny, Australian Capital Territory, a planned suburb in the Canberra district of Gungahlin

In outer space:
 10107 Kenny, an asteroid

Entertainment
 Kenny (1988 film), a Canadian documentary
 Kenny (2006 film), an Australian mockumentary
 Kenny G, stage name of jazz saxophonist Kenneth Bruce Gorelick (born 1956)
 Kenny (band), a mid-1970s glamrock/pop band from London
 Kenny (album), a 1979 music album by Kenny Rogers
  Kenny, a 2018 short film by Jennette McCurdy

See also

 
 Kenney (disambiguation)
 Kinne (disambiguation)
 Kinney (disambiguation)
 Kinnie (disambiguation)